John Olsen (30 December 1928 – 28 June 2001) was a Norwegian footballer. He played in one match for the Norway national football team in 1954.

References

External links
 

1928 births
2001 deaths
Norwegian footballers
Norway international footballers
Place of birth missing
Association footballers not categorized by position